Veratrilla is a genus of flowering plants belonging to the family Gentianaceae.

Its native range is Himalaya to Southern Central China.

Species:
 Veratrilla baillonii Franch. 
 Veratrilla burkilliana (W.W.Sm.) Harry Sm.

References

Gentianaceae
Gentianaceae genera